Field's horned viper (Pseudocerastes fieldi) is a species of snake in the family Viperidae. The species is native to the deserts of the Middle East. Like all other vipers, it is venomous. It was previously considered a subspecies of the Persian horned viper (Pseudocerastes persicus). The main differences between this species and the Persian horned viper are in scalation and venom composition.

Taxonomy and etymology
Formerly considered a subspecies of P. persicus, most sources elevate P. fieldi to species level. The first phylogenetic study of the genus Pseudocerastes, published by Fathinia et al. in 2014, shows that P. fieldi has equal genetic distance from both P. persicus and another species of the same genus, P. urarachnoides.

The specific epithet fieldi is in honor of American anthropologist Henry Field, who collected the holotype. The Field Museum of Natural History in Chicago and its scientific publication, Fieldiana, in which K.P. Schmidt's original description of this viper appeared, are named for Henry Field's grandfather, Marshall Field.

Description
Outwardly, Field's horned viper differs from the Persian horned viper (Pseudocerastes persicus) in certain (lower) scale counts:

Additional differences from the Persian horned viper include much shorter (relatively to the overall body length) tail as well as the fact that while in P. persicus all dorsal and lateral scales are strongly keeled, P. fieldi has several rows of almost smooth lateral scales.

Geographic distribution
According to McDiarmid et al. (1999) P. fieldi is found in the Sinai Peninsula, Israel, Jordan, northern Saudi Arabia, northwestern Iraq, and possibly in southern Syria.

The type locality given in the original description is "Bair Wells, Transjordania" [Jordan].

According to Mallow et al. (2003) it is found in the Sinai Peninsula, southern Israel, Jordan, extreme northern Saudi Arabia, and southwestern Iraq.

Habitat
It has also been found in agricultural areas, but not in or around houses.

Reproduction
P. fieldi is oviparous.

Venom
There is a more pronounced difference between the two species, P. fieldi and P. persicus, with regard to their venom. While Persian horned viper venom exhibits strong hemorrhagic activity typical of most vipers, the venom of P. fieldi is unusual in that contains several fractions that show marked neurotoxic activity. No antivenin is available for bites from either species. It is reported that a polyvalent antiserum does offer some protection from the hemotoxins, but none against the neurotoxic effects of P. fieldi venom.

References

Further reading

Duméril AMC, Bibron G, Duméril AHA (1854). Erpétologie générale ou histoire naturelle complète des reptiles. Tome septième. Deuxième partie, comprenant l'histoire des serpents venimeux. Paris: Librairie Encyclopédique de Roret. pp. i–xii + 781–1536. (Cerastes persicus, new species, pp. 1443–1444). (in French).
Joger U (1984). "The venomous snakes of the Near and Middle East". Beihefte zum Tübinger Atlas des Vorderen Orients, A 12. Wiesbaden: Dr. Ludwig Reichert Verlag.
Lehmann, Michael (1982). "Pseudocerastes persicus fieldi (Schmidt) im Terrarium". Herpetofauna 4 (21): 20–22. (in German).
Marx H, Rabb GB. 1965. Relationships and Zoogeography of the Viperine Snakes (Family Viperidae). Fieldiana Zool. 44 (21): 161–206.
Obst FJ (1983). "Zur Kenntnis der Schlangengattung Vipera". Zoologische Abhandlungen der staatliches Museum für Tierkunde in Dresden 38: 229–235. (in German).
Schmidt KP (1930). "Reptiles of Marshall Field North Arabian Desert Expeditions, 1927–1928". Fieldiana Zool. 17 (6): 221–130. (Pseudocerastes fieldi, new species, pp. 227–229 + Figure 2).

External links

Viperinae
Snakes of Africa
Vertebrates of Egypt
Reptiles of the Middle East
Fauna of Iraq
Reptiles of the Arabian Peninsula
Taxa named by Karl Patterson Schmidt
Reptiles described in 1930
Snakes of Jordan